The Quarry is a 2022 interactive drama horror video game developed by Supermassive Games and published by 2K. Players assume control of nine teenage counsellors who must survive their last night at Hackett's Quarry summer camp amongst supernatural creatures and violent locals. Players make many choices throughout the game which may significantly affect character development, relationships, the story's plot, and its ending. All nine playable characters may survive or die, depending on the player's decisions.

Envisioned as the spiritual successor to Until Dawn (2015) and inspired by teen slasher and monster films such as Friday the 13th and The Thing, the game features a large ensemble cast including Brenda Song, David Arquette, Halston Sage, Ted Raimi, Ariel Winter, Ethan Suplee, Lance Henriksen, Lin Shaye, Justice Smith, and Grace Zabriskie. The Quarry was released on 10 June 2022 for PlayStation 4, PlayStation 5, Windows, Xbox One, and Xbox Series X/S.

The game received mostly positive reviews from critics, who praised its narrative, characters, cast performances, graphics, and its homage to classic horror movies, though criticism was aimed at its abrupt endings.

Gameplay
Played from a third-person perspective, the player assumes control of nine different teenagers who must survive a night at the Hackett's Quarry. The player must regularly make different decisions, which can change the character development, the plot, and the relationships between different characters. All nine playable characters may die via multiple ways by the end of the game. Although the game lasts about ten hours, early deaths of certain characters may shorten it.

The game is divided into ten chapters along with a prologue and epilogue. In between each chapter, as is traditional with Supermassive Games' horror games, there are occasional intermissions with a narrator, this time being fortune teller, Eliza (Grace Zabriskie), addresses the player directly and guides their future choices by reading tarot cards that the player has collected throughout the game.

Due to the game's branching storyline, it has 186 different endings, affected by player choices, performances in quick-time events, and vigilance in finding evidence and clues determine the game's conclusion, as well as the public's perception of the deaths that occurred at Hackett's Quarry. Once the player completes their first playthrough of the game, they will unlock Death Rewind, which allows them to undo three character deaths in each subsequent playthrough. Players can disable certain gameplay elements such as button mashing, quick-time events, and aiming and shooting, allowing them to progress in the game with minimum input.

The game features local and online multiplayer. In local multiplayer, players take turns to control different characters, while in the online mode, seven other participating players can vote in key decisions. Players can participate in voting by only downloading the demo version of The Quarry. The game also features a movie mode in which the player can set the personality traits of different characters and then let the story play out. Downloadable content was also included for purchase which allowed the player to use the "Death Rewind" option at the first playthrough, as well as an "80s throwback" mode which gives the characters alternate outfits which were popular in the 1980s.

Plot 

Laura Kearney (Siobhan Williams) and Max Brinly (Skyler Gisondo) drive during nighttime to visit Hackett's Quarry, where the two have been hired as summer camp counselors. The two swerve off the road to avoid hitting something on the road and crash into the woods. A local county sheriff (Ted Raimi) approaches their car and orders them to stay the night at a nearby motel, but the two drive to the camp anyway. Upon arrival, Laura hears a noise coming from a civil defense shelter under the lodge and opens it. Max is attacked by a monster and the sheriff arrives at the camp to sedate Laura, who falls unconscious.

Two months later, seven camp counselors—Abigail Blyg (Ariel Winter), Dylan Lenivy (Miles Robbins), Emma Mountebank (Halston Sage), Jacob Custos (Zach Tinker), Kaitlyn Ka (Brenda Song), Nick Furcillo (Evan Evagora), and Ryan Erzahler (Justice Smith)— have closed the Hackett's Quarry summer camp due to summer's end and are saying goodbye to a busload of departing children. However, their own plans to return to civilization are derailed by Jacob, who had recently been dumped by Emma. Jacob clandestinely sabotages the camp van in an attempt to spend one more night at the camp and win back Emma. The camp owner, Chris Hackett (David Arquette), asks them to stay locked inside the lodge for the night and tells them he will return with help in the morning. The group instead decides to look for beer, throw a bonfire party, and play a game of Truth or Dare. Kaitlyn dares Emma to kiss Jacob or Nick, Abigail's crush. Emma chooses Nick, kissing him passionately, causing both Abigail and Jacob to storm off.

Throughout the night, two hunters named Bobby (Ethan Suplee) and Jedediah (Lance Henriksen) stalk the counselors, with the belief that if they capture any they are to dab their heads with wolf's blood. Nick reunites with Abigail in the woods, but a monster attacks them and bites Nick. Jacob reunites with Emma by the lake, where she suggests they enjoy their last night together by swimming. Their frivolity gets interrupted when Jacob hears Abigail's screams and runs into the woods to help her, while Emma swims to an island in the middle of the lake where she is attacked by another monster and is possibly killed. Dylan, Kaitlyn, and Ryan rescue Nick, taking him to the camp lodge to recover. Dylan and Ryan call for outside help by going to Chris Hackett's office, but their attempts to summon first responders are impeded by an abrupt power outage and loss of phone service. The two then proceed to the radio hut on an off chance of broadcasting their distress to any citizens band radio listeners. While heading to the pool house, the counselors briefly see a monster which is killed by a shotgun blast. By the time they reach the swimming pool, there is no monster, but they find the dead body of Kaylee Hackett, Chris' daughter. Nick's condition worsens, and he soon transforms into a werewolf, possibly killing Abigail before scurrying off.

Laura appears immediately afterwards. She tells them that the sheriff was Chris' brother, Travis Hackett, who imprisoned her and Max for two months without preparing charges against them. During this time, they learned about a werewolf curse which is spread through biting. Laura reveals that Chris and his children, Kaylee and Caleb, become werewolves every full moon. One month earlier, Sheriff Hackett revealed the truth by making Laura watch Max transform under a full moon, where he then gouges her eye in bestial rage. Some time later, the pair escape and head to Hackett's Quarry. Laura learns that the curse can be revoked by killing the infecting werewolf under a full moon's sky and as such she aims to kill Chris to cure Max; Ryan reluctantly agrees to help with Laura's mission. Laura had detained Max on the island, revealing he was the werewolf who attacked Emma. She returned to the island only to find an uncured Max, then returned to the mainland upon realizing the werewolf she killed was not Chris. The two head toward the Hackett residence, where the matriarch, Constance (Lin Shaye), berates Travis for failing to protect their family. It is revealed that Jedediah is the Hackett family patriarch, with Bobby, Chris, and Travis as their sons. Laura and Ryan learn more about the Hackett family's history within their home, and they eavesdrop on the conversation between Constance and Travis. The Hacketts capture them, and a fight ensues. During the commotion, a werewolf Chris attacks his family, as well as Laura and Ryan, who gets the opportunity to kill Chris.

Depending on who survived the altercation, Travis can reveal to Laura that the curse does not end with Chris' death. He explains that its progenitor was Silas Vorez - the cursed son of the fortune teller Eliza (Grace Zabriskie). Six years ago, the Hackett family visited her freak show, and Chris' children tried to free Silas by starting a fire as a distraction. The sideshow burned down, and Silas bit Caleb upon his freeing, who passed the curse onto Chris and Kaylee. Laura, Ryan, and Travis can drive towards the same spot where Laura and Max crashed two months ago to kill Silas and end the curse permanently.

In all endings, police and cars from an unknown government agency comes to the location to investigate.

Afterwards, the fortune teller who has been guiding the player's actions throughout the game reveals herself to be the spirit of Eliza, seeking vengeance on the Hacketts. Depending on whether all of the Hacketts are killed and whether Silas is spared, Eliza will either congratulate the player, be disappointed in the player and banish them from Hackett's Quarry, or be furious with the player and promise to haunt them for the rest of their lives.

Development
The Quarry was developed by British developer Supermassive Games, and was envisioned as a spiritual successor to the studio's Until Dawn (2015). It is heavily inspired by teen slasher and monster films, and adheres to established horror movie tropes more firmly than The Dark Pictures Anthology, Supermassive's other horror franchise. Creative director Will Byles added that while the game is set in modern times, "there's a very '80s feel" about the setting and the characters, citing movies including Sleepaway Camp and Friday the 13th as major sources of inspiration. The locals living near the Hackett's Quarry have a more "retro" feel and the team was influenced by films such as The Hills Have Eyes, The Texas Chainsaw Massacre, and Deliverance. Supermassive was also inspired by Evil Dead and The Thing. The team wanted the game to feature horror movie tropes from different eras, and Byles went on to compare the game to a horror theme park. While the game pays homage to various horror films, the team learnt from their experience making Until Dawn, allowing the team to build up players' fear through creating tension rather than relying heavily on jump scares.

To capture the feelings of a classic horror films, Supermassive recruited a large cast of actors and several genre mainstays to portray the characters in the game, and collaborated with Los Angeles-based production company Digital Domain on the game's motion capture technology. The game's ensemble cast includes David Arquette, Siobhan Williams, Lin Shaye, Lance Henriksen, Grace Zabriskie, Ted Raimi, Ariel Winter, Ethan Suplee, Miles Robbins, Halston Sage, Zach Tinker, Brenda Song, Skyler Gisondo, Evan Evagora, and Justice Smith.  According to Byles, the team wrote more than 1,000 pages for the game's script, and the game has a total of 186 different endings.

While Until Dawn was designed to be a solo experience, the team found that players like to play the game in small groups, and acknowledged that Until Dawn was a popular game for people to simply watch. Therefore, the game introduced a Movie mode, and expanded the multiplayer options introduced in previous Supermassive games such as Hidden Agenda and The Dark Pictures Anthology in order to appeal to people who would simply like to watch the game. The accessibility options were also designed to cater to more casual gamers who may not be experienced in playing games. When compared to The Dark Pictures Anthology, The Quarry was designed for a broader audience and had a smaller focus on gameplay.

Publisher 2K and Supermassive officially unveiled the game on 18 March 2022. The game was initially planned to be a Stadia exclusive, but ultimately did not release on the platform due to Google cancelling its plans for first-party titles in February 2021. The game was released for PlayStation 4, PlayStation 5, Windows, Xbox One, and Xbox Series X and Series S on 10 June 2022. Players who purchased the Deluxe version of the game would unlock the "Gorefest" option in the Movie mode, which features more brutal imagery when compared to the normal Movie mode. They would also receive additional character outfits, instant access to the Death Rewind feature, and the Horror History Visual Filter Pack, which allows players to change the aesthetic of the game by choosing from three visual filters inspired by horror films in different eras and various styles of horror filmmaking.

Reception

The Quarry received "generally favorable" reviews for Windows and Xbox Series X/S and "mixed or average" reviews for PlayStation 5, according to review aggregator Metacritic.

Destructoid stated that The Quarry successfully replicated what made its predecessors unique and praised its ability to "fluctuate between tension, drama, and levity", while writing, "These games are at their best when they leverage classic horror while also infusing some modern touches, meta moments, and well-timed laughs..." Game Informer lamented the limited player agency but praised the quality of the "enthralling" choices and engaging narrative. GameRevolution thought highly of the title's character development, graphic quality, Movie Mode, and branching narrative design, but felt that the exploration mode was slow and that its camera was claustrophobic. GamesRadar+ thought that its slow beginning, frequent pacing issues, and excessively large cast of characters hindered the game, but that some engaging plot points, quality voicework, and good graphics somewhat alleviated these issues. GameSpot praised the game's snappy dialogue, ensemble cast, love for horror movies, and the "palpable sense of weight behind many choices", but criticized the "glacial" walking speed of the exploration and the narrative's pacing issues.

IGN favored the script, cast, and various narrative climaxes, but disliked the lack of player interactivity and the absence of quality-of-life features, concluding, "The Quarry is worth playing at least once, but when compared to Until Dawn, it's one step forward and one step back." PC Gamer felt that while the title retained the strengths of the developer's previous games, it only showed marks of improvement through its production values, and stated, "The plot, performances and visual fidelity are worth turning up for, as are some of the shocks, but more than ever much of your involvement seems like protective padding sandwiched between the scripted thrills." Shacknews gave high praise to the dynamically branching storylines, unique characters, homages to classic horror, and solid scares, but took minor issue with the fixed camera creating some awkward moments and the inability to fast-forward on repeat playthroughts. The Guardian gave it four out of five stars, writing, "The Quarry’s charming writing and cinematic presentation make it an engrossing horror caper – even if this is, paradoxically, a game that’s often at its best when you’re not actively playing it."

Sales

The Quarry was the 4th best-selling retail video game in the United Kingdom in its week of release. 84% of the game's launch sales in the UK came from PlayStation users. In the United States, the game was the 19th best-selling video game of June 2022.

Accolades

References

External links
 
 

2020s horror video games
2022 video games
2K games
Interactive movie video games
Permadeath games
PlayStation 4 games
PlayStation 4 Pro enhanced games
PlayStation 5 games
Single-player video games
Supermassive Games
Take-Two Interactive games
Unreal Engine games
Video games developed in the United Kingdom
Video games featuring female protagonists
Video games set in forests
Video games set in New York (state)
Video games with alternate endings
Windows games
Xbox One games
Xbox One X enhanced games
Xbox Series X and Series S games
Video games featuring black protagonists